The 1969 Boston College Eagles football team represented Boston College as an independent during the 1969 NCAA University Division football season. Led by second-year head coach Joe Yukica, the Eagles compiled a record of 5–4. Boston College played home games at Alumni Stadium in Chestnut Hill, Massachusetts.

Schedule

Roster

Coaching staff

References

Boston College
Boston College Eagles football seasons
Boston College Eagles football
1960s in Boston